Jacob Paulson (born 15 January 1997), known professionally as JK-47, is an Indigenous Australian rapper, musician, and activist from Tweed Heads South, New South Wales.

His debut album, Made for This, was released independently on 4 September 2020.

Early life
Jacob Paulson was born in Tweed Heads, New South Wales. Paulson is a Minjungbal/Gudjinburra man of the Bundjalung community. He attended Tweed River High School for his secondary education from 2009 to 2015. He began rapping and writing music at the age of 14. In a July 2020 interview with the Tweed Valley Weekly, Paulson discussed how he came to be a rapper, stating: "I have always been into rap since I was in third or fourth grade. My brother and cousin used to rap and so I always wanted to be a rapper... I like to keep it real and I like my music to have a message."

Career

2019: Career beginnings and "Came for the Lot"
On 13 September 2019, Paulson released his debut solo single "Came for the Lot", featuring Brisbane rapper Nerve. Later that month, he featured on Nerve's single "Sunday Roast", a song credited as both artists' breakthrough. At the end of the month, Paulson was Nerve's support act at Listen Out Festival.

2020–present: "The Recipe" and Made for This
On 22 January 2020, Paulson was announced as a support act for Adrian Eagle's Mama Tour in support of Eagle's EP of the same name. On 29 May, Paulson released the single "The Recipe". The track received frequent rotation on Triple J and saw him become a Triple J Unearthed Feature Artist on the station. On 1 July, The Music revealed in an exclusive that New World Artists had signed Paulson to their roster and additionally announced an initial August release date for his forthcoming debut album. On 3 July, Paulson released the single "I Am Here (Trust Me)", featuring Phoebe Jacobs & Hazy. The song discusses mental health and Aboriginal deaths in custody. On 8 August, Paulson performed his track "Outta Here" virtually at the 17th Annual National Indigenous Music Awards. "Outta Time" was later featured on his debut album Made for This. On 4 September, he independently released his debut album, Made for This. In January 2021, Paulson performed at Yours and Owls Festival.

On 11 February 2021, Paulson performed a cover of 2Pac's "Changes" with Bronte Eve for Triple J's Like a Version segment, alongside a performance of "The Recipe" as his original track. In March, Paulson performed at the Adelaide Festival's hip hop finale concert. The event had an all-indigenous line-up, featuring Jimblah, Ziggy Ramo and J-Milla. On 1 July, Australian record company Waxx Lyrical announced Made for This as their "Record of the Month". Following the announcement, the company reissued the album on vinyl for a limited run of 150 copies.

In August 2022, Paulson released "At One (reVision)" and announced the forthcoming release of his second studio album, Revision for Regrowth.

Personal life
Paulson's partner Lauren gave birth to their son, Zuriel, in June 2020.

Musical style and influences
Paulson is primarily a hip hop and Australian hip hop artist. His music frequently discusses issues facing Indigenous Australians.

Paulson's track "The Recipe" has been favourably compared to late American rapper Nipsey Hussle, an artist whom he considers an influence. He also lists J. Cole, Kendrick Lamar, the Game, Joey Bada$$, and Lauryn Hill as musical influences.

Discography

Studio albums

Singles

As lead artist

As featured artist

Promotional singles

Notes

Awards and nominations

National Indigenous Music Awards
The National Indigenous Music Awards (NIMAs) recognise excellence, dedication, innovation and outstanding contribution to the Northern Territory music industry. In 2020, Paulson was nominated for one award, which he won.

! 
|-
! scope="row"| 2020
| Himself
| Triple J Unearthed National Indigenous Competition
| 
| 
|-
! scope="row" rowspan="1"| 2021
| Made for This
| Album of the Year
| 
| 
|}

J Awards
The J Awards are an annual series of Australian music awards that were established by the Australian Broadcasting Corporation's youth-focused radio station Triple J. They commenced in 2005.

! 
|-
! scope="row" rowspan="2"| 2020 
| Made for This 
| Australian Album of the Year
| 
| 
|-
| Himself
| Unearthed Artist of the Year
| 
| 
|}

Rolling Stone Australia Awards
The Rolling Stone Australia Awards are awarded annually in January or February by the Australian edition of Rolling Stone magazine for outstanding contributions to popular culture in the previous year.

! 
|-
| 2021
| JK-47
| Best New Artist
| 
| 
|-

Concert tours

Supporting
 Mama Tour – Adrian Eagle (2020)

References

External links
 
 

1997 births
Australian male rappers
Bundjalung people
Date of birth missing (living people)
Hip hop activists
Indigenous Australian musicians
Living people